John George I of Anhalt-Dessau (9 May 1567 – 24 May 1618) was a German prince of the House of Ascania. From 1586 to 1603 he ruled the unified principality of Anhalt jointly with his brothers. After the partition of the principality in 1603, he ruled the principality of Anhalt-Dessau from 1603 to 1618.

John George was much appreciated by his subjects and considered learned abroad, particularly in the subjects of astrology and alchemy. He possessed a remarkable library with over 3000 volumes.

Life

Early life
John George was born in Harzgerode on 9 May 1567 as the eldest son of Joachim Ernest, Prince of Anhalt-Zerbst, by his first wife Agnes, daughter of Wolfgang I, Count of Barby-Mühlingen.

In 1570, the death of John George's last surviving uncle, Bernhard VII, Prince of Anhalt-Zerbst, left John George's father as sole ruler of all the Anhalt states, which were finally unified for the first time since their first partition in 1252.

Joint prince of Anhalt

After the death of his father in 1586, John George inherited the unified principality of Anhalt jointly with his younger brother Christian I and his five half-brothers according to the family law of the House of Ascania, which mandated no division of territories among the heirs. Because his half-brothers were still minors at the time of their accession, John George acted as regent.

Prince of Anhalt-Dessau
In 1603 an agreement was drawn up between John George and his surviving brothers to divide the territories of the principality of Anhalt among them. John George received Anhalt-Dessau, as well as the Seniorat; nonetheless, he maintained a regency over all of the newly created principalities until 1606, when his brothers took over the government in  their lands. As a ruler, he maintained Reformation policies in his state and vigorously pursued the abolition of the traditional customs and liturgy of the Roman Catholic Church.

The Fruitbearing Society
On 24 August 1617 at Schloss Hornstein (later Wilhelmsburg Castle) during the funeral of their sister Dorothea Maria, Duchess of Saxe-Weimar, John George and his younger brother Louis of Anhalt-Köthen created the Fruitbearing Society. The Prince of Köthen was appointed its first leader.

Death and succession
John George died in Dessau on 24 May 1618 at the age of 51. He was succeeded as Prince of Anhalt-Dessau by his eldest surviving son, John Casimir.

Marriages and Issue

Marriages
In Hedersleben on 22 February 1588 John George married Dorothea (b. 23 March 1561 – d. Dessau, 23 February 1594), daughter of John Albert VI, Count of Mansfeld-Arnstein. They had five children.

In Heidelberg on 21 February 1595 John George married for a second time to Dorothea (b. Kaiserslautern, 6 January 1581 – d. Sandersleben, 18 September 1631), the only surviving child of John Casimir of Simmern, third son of Frederick III, Elector Palatine. They had eleven children.

Issue

1567 births
1618 deaths
German Calvinist and Reformed Christians
House of Ascania
Princes of Anhalt-Dessau